Choi Jun (born 17 April 1999) is a South Korean footballer currently playing as a full-back for Busan IPark.

He is considered one of the most promising players of his generation in South Korea, regarding his versatility (mainly used as a right-back, he can also play as a left-back, a wing-back or a midfielder), his pace, his technique and his work rate.

Club career

The beginnings 
A product of K League 1 power-houses Ulsan Hyundai's academy and a graduate from Yonsei University, in 2020 he gained a move to Ulsan's senior team, after his impressive performances for the national youth teams gained the attention of scouts from several European clubs. However, as the "Horangi" could already count on more experienced players such as Park Joo-ho (on the left side) and Kim Tae-hwan (on the right), Choi was soon loaned to K League 2 side Gyeongnam, where he consequently played his first professional season.

Gyeongnam 
He made his professional debut on July 1, 2020, playing the entirety of a Korean FA Cup match against Jeonnam Dragons, with his side eventually suffering a 4-0 away loss. Being at the start of his senior career, Choi initially had mixed fortunes in Changwon, registering two assists but also five yellow cards in his first ten matches with Gyeongnam. However, as the season progressed he was praised for showing a hard-working attitude and a good chemistry with his team-mates on the right wing (alternatively, Ko Kyung-min or Negueba). On October 25, 2020, he registered his first goal ever, by netting the winner in a 4-3 away win against Bucheon FC 1995.

As Gyeongnam gained a spot in the promotion play-offs, Choi had the opportunity to take part in two more matches: a 1-1 draw against Daejeon Hana Citizen (Gyeongnam advanced to the following round due to a better placement in the regular league table) and the final against Suwon FC. In this occasion, Choi scored the opening goal of the match, but then An Byong-jun equalized, scoring a penalty kick in the final moments of injury time and giving Suwon the promotion to K League 1, again due to better placement.

Choi closed his experience in Changwon having registered 20 league appearances and two goals.

Busan IPark 
Once returned to Ulsan, Choi got quickly destined to another transfer: in fact, he joined Busan IPark (who had just been relegated in K League 2) on a permanent basis, together with fellow team-mates Jung Hoon-sung and Lee Sang-heon, as part of the operation that brought Lee Dong-jun to the "Horangi".

International career 
He has frequently represented South Korea at Under-19 and Under-20 level.

In 2018, he took part both in the Toulon Tournament, where the South Korean selection was eliminated in the group stage, and the AFC Under-19 Championship, where his side reached the final before losing 1-2 to eventual winners Saudi Arabia.

In 2019, he was selected by head coach Chung Jung-yong to take part in the FIFA U-20 World Cup in Poland, being one of the only two players in South Korea's 21-men list (together with Jeong Ho-jin) who hadn't started their senior career, yet. Used as a left-back, he played every single match of his side, assisting Oh Se-hun's winner against Japan in the round of 16 and scoring, in order, one penalty in South Korea's successful shoot-out against Senegal (in the quarter-finals) and the only goal of the victory against Ecuador in the semi-finals. As a result, he played a considerable role in the Taeguk Warriors' road to the tournament's final, then lost to Ukraine with the score of 3-1.

Career statistics

Club

Honours

International 
South Korea U19

 AFC U-19 Championship runner-up: 2018

South Korea U20

 FIFA U-20 World Cup runner-up: 2019

References

1999 births
Living people
South Korean footballers
South Korea youth international footballers
Association football defenders
Yonsei University alumni
K League 2 players
Ulsan Hyundai FC players
Gyeongnam FC players
South Korea under-20 international footballers